Sarala Devi Chaudhurani (born Sarala Ghosal; 9 September 1872 – 18 August 1945) was an Indian educationist and political activist, who founded Bharat Stree Mahamandal in Allahabad in 1910. This was the first national-level women's organization in India. One of the primary goals of the organization was to promote female education. The organization opened several offices in Lahore (then part of unpartitioned India), Allahabad, Delhi, Karachi, Amritsar, Hyderabad, Kanpur, Bankura, Hazaribagh, Midnapur, and Kolkata to improve the situation of women all over India.

Biography

Early life
Sarala was born in Jorasanko, Kolkata on 9 September 1872 to a well known Bengali intellectual family. Her father Janakinath Ghosal was one of the first secretaries of the Bengal Congress. Her mother Swarnakumari Devi, a noted author, was the daughter of Debendranath Tagore, an eminent Brahmo leader and father of poet Rabindranath Tagore. Her older sister, Hironmoyee, was an author and founder of a widow's home. Sarla Devi's family was a follower of Brahmoism, a religion founded by Ram Mohan Roy and later developed by Sarala's grandfather Debendranath Tagore. 

In 1890, she earned her BA in English literature from Bethune College. She was awarded the college's first Padmavati Gold Medal for being the top female candidate in her BA examinations. She was one of the few women of her time to participate in the Indian independence movement. During anti partition agitation she spread the gospel of nationalism in Punjab and maintained secret revolutionary society.

Career
Upon completing her education, Sarala went to Mysore State and joined the Maharani Girls' School as a school teacher. A year later, she returned home and started writing for Bharati, a Bengali journal, while also beginning her political activities.

From 1895 to 1899, she edited Bharati jointly with her mother and sister, and then on her own from 1899 to 1907, with the goal of propagating patriotism and to raise up the literary standard of the journal. In 1904, she started the Lakshmi Bhandar (women's store) in Kolkata to popularize native handicrafts produced by women. In 1910, she founded the Bharat Stree Mahamandal (All India Women's Organization), which is regarded by many historians as the first All-Indian organization for women. With several branches around the country, it promoted education and vocational training for women without consideration of class, caste and religion.

Personal life
In 1905, Sarala Devi married Rambhuj Dutt Chaudhary (1866–1923), a lawyer, journalist, nationalist leader and follower of Arya Samaj, the Hindu reform movement founded by Swami Dayananda Saraswati.

After her marriage, she moved to Punjab. There, she helped her husband edit the nationalist Urdu weekly Hindusthan, which was later converted into an English periodical. When her husband was arrested for his involvement in Non-cooperation movement, Mahatma Gandhi visited her home in Lahore as a guest. Gandhi quoted her poems and writings  in his speeches, and in Young India and other journals. In February 1920, Young India published several letters concerned with her membership of Lahore Purdah Club. After Sarala's husband was arrested for his part in Rowlatt satyagraha, Una O'Dwyer (wife of Michael O'Dwyer) wanted her to resign her membership. 

She travelled with him all over India. When apart, they frequently exchanged letters. According to Rabindra Bharati University Vice-Chancellor Professor Sabyasachi Basu Ray Chaudhury, the relationship between the two, although close, was nothing more than mutual admiration. But in one of the letter to Sarala, Gandhi wrote : You still continue to haunt me even in my sleep. No wonder Panditji calls you the greatest shakti of India. You may have cast that spell over him. Your are performing the trick over me now.Her only son, Dipak, married Gandhi's granddaughter Radha.

Later life
After her husband's death in 1923, Sarala Devi returned to Kolkata, and resumed editing responsibilities for Bharati from 1924 to 1926. She established a girls' school, Siksha Sadan in Kolkata in 1930. She retired from public life in 1935 and indulged religion, accepting Bijoy Krishna Goswami, a Gaudiya Vaisnava, as her spiritual teacher.

She died on 18 August 1945 in Kolkata.

Her autobiography Jivaner Jhara Pata  was serialized in Desh, a Bengali literary magazine, during the later period of her life, in 1942–1943. It was later translated into English by Sikata Banerjee as The Scattered Leaves of My Life (2011).

References

Further reading

External links
 

Indian feminists
Indian women's rights activists
1945 deaths
1872 births
Bengali Hindus
Bengali educators
20th-century Bengalis
19th-century Bengalis
Bethune College alumni
University of Calcutta alumni
Indian educational theorists
Indian women educational theorists
19th-century Indian educational theorists
20th-century Indian educational theorists
Indian women scientists
20th-century Indian women scientists
19th-century Indian women scientists
Indian educators
20th-century Indian educators
19th-century Indian educators
Indian women educators
Educationists from India
Women educators from West Bengal
19th-century women writers
20th-century women writers
19th-century women educators
20th-century women educators
Indian social reformers
Indian social workers
Indian activists
Indian autobiographers
Indian academics
Indian women academics
Founders of Indian schools and colleges
Women scientists from West Bengal
Women writers from West Bengal
Activists from West Bengal
Indian women activists
Indian political scientists
Indian reformers
Swadeshi activists
Indian political writers